Amy Benedict is an American film and television actress. She is the sister of Rob Benedict. She was born and raised in Columbia, Missouri, and attended Rock Bridge High School. She is a graduate of Northwestern University.

She is known for recurring roles on Thirtysomething and General Hospital and as "Mary the NSA agent" in the movie Sneakers.

Filmography

Television

Film

External links

Living people
Northwestern University alumni
American film actresses
American television actresses
Actors from Columbia, Missouri
Rock Bridge High School alumni
21st-century American women
Year of birth missing (living people)